was a Japanese politician who served as the 77th Prime Minister of Japan from 1989 to 1991.

Early life and education 
Kaifu was born on 2 January 1931, in Nagoya City, the eldest of six brothers. His family's business Nakamura Photo Studio was established by his grandfather in the Meiji era, and was situated next to the Matsuzakaya flagship department store.

Kaifu took the exam to the Aichi Prefectural Asahigaoka Senior High School, and while of the eleven students who took the test from the same school, nine were accepted and two, including Kaifu, were not. As part of the student labor mobilization during the war, he was placed in a Mitsui Heavy Industry factory where he assembled airplane engine parts day and night. In 1945, he was accepted in the Youth Airman Academy of the Imperial Japanese Army, but the war ended before his planned enrolment in October. He was then educated at Chuo University and Waseda University.

On 17 November 1957 Kaifu married Saburō Yanagihara, a female assistant to Member of the House of Representatives.

Career 

A member of the Liberal Democratic Party (LDP), Kaifu ran successfully for the 1960 Japanese general election and took office as the youngest member of the National Diet. He served for sixteen terms, totaling 48 years.

Kaifu was education minister before rising to lead the party after the resignations of Takeshita Noboru and Sōsuke Uno. Facing Yoshiro Hayashi and Shintaro Ishihara, Kaifu was elected on the platform of clean leadership. He became the 76th Prime Minister of Japan in August 1989.

On 10 August 1991, Kaifu became the first leader of a major country to make an official visit to China and break China's diplomatic isolation after the 1989 Tiananmen Square protests and massacre. Kaifu ended Japan's participation in economic sanctions against China and offered $949.9 million in loans and an additional $1.5 million in emergency aid following flood damage in southern China in June and July. In 1991 he sent the  Maritime Self-Defense Force to the Persian Gulf in the wake of the Gulf War.

Throughout his two Cabinets, Kaifu's faction was too small to push through the reforms he sought, and the continuing repercussions of the Sagawa Express scandal caused problems. He resigned in November 1991 and was replaced by Kiichi Miyazawa.

In 1994, he left the LDP to become head of the newly-founded New Frontier Party. He supported Ichirō Ozawa's party until he returned to LDP in 2003. He was defeated in the election of 2009 by DPJ candidate Mitsunori Okamoto, which witnessed the end of almost uninterrupted LDP dominance since 1955. At the time of his defeat, he was the longest-serving member of the lower house of the Diet, and he was also the first former prime minister to be defeated at a re-election since 1963.

Death 
Kaifu was the last surviving former Japanese prime minister who had served in the 1980s. He died from pneumonia on 9 January 2022 at a Tokyo hospital, at the age of 91. The announcement of his death to the media was delayed until 14 January.

References

External links 
 KAIFU, Toshiki International Who's Who. Retrieved 3 September 2006.

|-

|-

|-

|-

|-

|-

|-

|-

|-

|-

1931 births
2022 deaths 
Deaths from pneumonia in Japan
20th-century Japanese politicians
20th-century prime ministers of Japan
21st-century Japanese politicians
Chuo University alumni
Waseda University alumni
Prime Ministers of Japan
Ministers of Finance of Japan
People from Nagoya
New Frontier Party (Japan) politicians
Liberal Democratic Party (Japan) politicians
Recipients of the Order of the Rising Sun
Politicians from Aichi Prefecture